Pürevdorjiin Nyamlkhagva (born 7 October 1974) is a Mongolian judoka. He competed at the 1996 Summer Olympics and the 2000 Summer Olympics.

References

External links
 

1974 births
Living people
Mongolian male judoka
Olympic judoka of Mongolia
Judoka at the 1996 Summer Olympics
Judoka at the 2000 Summer Olympics
Place of birth missing (living people)
20th-century Mongolian people
21st-century Mongolian people